Murray Bridge South is a satellite locality of Murray Bridge in South Australia west of the Murray River, south of the eponymous bridge, and west of Swanport Bridge. Its boundaries were formalised in March 2000 to cover a portion of semi-urban land immediately south of the South Eastern Freeway and immediately west of the riverside suburbs of Swanport and Riverglen.

See also
 List of cities and towns in South Australia

References

Towns in South Australia